Colquepucro  or Collquepucro (possibly from Quechua qullqi money, silver, p'ukru - s. gorge; ravine; gully; hollow; valley,) is a mountain in the Pariacaca or Huarochirí mountain range in the Andes of Peru, about  high. It is situated in the Junín Region, Jauja Province, Canchayllo District and in the Lima Region, Huarochiri Province, Quinti District. Colquepucro lies north-east of the mountains Corihuasi and Pariacaca.

References

Mountains of Peru
Mountains of Junín Region
Mountains of Lima Region